Turbo Ocho is the fifth studio album released by Roger Clyne and the Peacemakers. It was released on April 29, 2008.

Background
January 4, 2008, Roger Clyne & the Peacemakers started an eight consecutive day audio/video chronicle. A revolutionary reality-recording experiment where the band and crew set up a studio in a seaside home in Rocky Point, Mexico and broadcast daily audio and video episodes of a song a day to thousands of fans back home in the United States. They created and shared, from inspiration to the final mix, 8 songs in 8 days. Three more fan favorites were added to the song lineup for the final physical release two months later.

Track listing
"I Speak Your Language" - 2:58
"State of the Art" - 3:50
"I Know You Know" - 2:45
"Summer Number 39" - 3:25
"Mercy" - 3:24
"I Can Drink the Water" -6:02
"I Do" - 3:40
"Persephone" - 3:22
"Manana" - 3:47
"Captain Suburbia" - 4:06
"Mexicosis" - 3:51

2008 albums
Roger Clyne and the Peacemakers albums